Adem Poric (born 22 April 1973) is a soccer coach and former professional player, who is the chief executive and the head coach of Gold Coast Knights SC, as well as the president of youth academy side Magic United.

As a player, he was a midfielder from 1992 to 2002 and most notably played in the Premier League for Sheffield Wednesday. He also spent time in England playing in the Football League with Southend United, Rotherham United and Notts County as well as Australian sides St George Saints, Sydney Olympic, Northern Spirit FC  and City of Gold Coast. Born in England, he was capped twice by Australia U20.

Club career 
During the 1991–92 season he had an unsuccessful trial at Arsenal, playing in three reserve team games. Sheffield Wednesday signed Poric for £60,000 from St George Saints on 1 October 1993. He found it difficult to break into the first team at Hillsborough and loan spells at Southend United and Rotherham United followed. He made just 13 league appearances in two seasons for the Owls, then a Premier League side, under Trevor Francis.

He eventually joined Notts County on a free transfer on 27 March 1998. He had not appeared in a competitive game for Sheffield Wednesday for almost three years by this stage, his last appearance coming as a substitute against Manchester United in a 1–0 defeat at Old Trafford in the league on 7 May 1995.

International career 
He represented Australia at youth level.

Coaching career 
Poric has returned to Australia where he is involved in running the Total Football Academy. The Academy has developed links to Sheffield Wednesday with the first of an anticipated influx of academy players coming to Hillsborough in September 2008.

He is the president of Magic United. He is now also the Head Coach and CEO of Gold Coast Knights SC.

Personal life
Poric was born in London, England to Australian parents of Bosnian heritage.

References

External links

1973 births
Living people
Australian soccer players
Australian expatriate soccer players
Australian expatriate sportspeople in England
People of Slavic descent
Premier League players
Notts County F.C. players
Rotherham United F.C. players
Sheffield Wednesday F.C. players
Southend United F.C. players
Sydney Olympic FC players
Expatriate footballers in England
Association football midfielders